Grądki may refer to the following places:
Grądki, Masovian Voivodeship (east-central Poland)
Grądki, Subcarpathian Voivodeship (south-east Poland)
Grądki, Warmian-Masurian Voivodeship (north Poland)